Colin Douglas may refer to:

 Colin Douglas (novelist) (born 1945), Scottish novelist
 Colin Douglas (actor) (1912–1991), English actor
 Colin Douglas (footballer) (born 1962), former Scottish footballer